Wishing Well is a 2001 album by Monte Montgomery. It was produced by Montgomery and Carl Thiel.

Track listing
"Tug of War" — (4:00)
"Wishing Well" — (4:30)
"I Know What You Want" — (4:18)
"Catch Me" — (4:56)
"Tomorrow Begins With Today" — (4:22)
"Erased" — (5:05)
"Broken Arms" — (4:20)
"Soldier at His Best" — (3:08)
"Bagpipe" — (2:33)
"Sunset Lullaby" — (3:48)
"All on Me" — (7:15)
"Radio Girl" — (3:27)

Personnel
Musicians: 
Monte Montgomery — banjo, guitar, piano, arranger, vocals
Phil Bass — drums
Chris Maresh — bass
Michael Urdy — percussion
Jane Clark — fiddle
Production:
Joe Gastwirt — mastering
Cynthia S. Kinney  — design
Monte Montgomery — producer
Carl Thiel — co-producer, engineer, mixer
Todd V. Wolfson — photography

Monte Montgomery albums
2001 albums